Sir Arthur Herbert Drummond Ramsay Steel-Maitland, 1st Baronet (5 July 1876 – 30 March 1935) was a British Conservative politician. He was the first Chairman of the Conservative Party from 1911 to 1916 and held junior office from 1915 to 1919 in David Lloyd George's coalition government. From 1924 to 1929 he was Minister of Labour under Stanley Baldwin, with a seat in the cabinet.

Background and education

The second son of Mary Emmeline Eden Drummond, daughter of General Henry Drummond, and Colonel Edward Harris Steel, Steel-Maitland was educated at Rugby and at Balliol College, Oxford, where he was a classical Scholar and Eldon Scholar in 1899. He gained first class honours in classics and law, and became a Fellow of All Souls College in 1900. He was Secretary, Junior Treasurer and President of the Oxford Union Society, and rowed against Cambridge in 1899. His brother, Col. Richard Steel, was concerned with MIO during the war.

Political career
Steel-Maitland was appointed an assistant private secretary (unpaid) to the Chancellor of the Exchequer, Charles Ritchie, in October 1902. He unsuccessfully contested Rugby in 1906, and was a Special Commissioner to the Royal Commission on the Poor Laws from 1906 to 1907. He was elected as Member of Parliament for Birmingham East in 1910, a seat he held until 1918, and then represented Birmingham Erdington from 1918 to 1929 and Tamworth from 1929 until 1935. He was the first Chairman of the Conservative Party from 1911 to 1916, and founded the Unionist Social Reform Committee in 1911.

Steel-Maitland served under David Lloyd George as Under-Secretary of State for the Colonies from 1915 to 1917. The latter year he was created a Baronet, of Sauchie in the County of Stirling. He then held office under Lloyd George as Secretary for Overseas Trade in his capacity as Head of the Department of Overseas Trade (Development and Intelligence) from 1917 to 1919. In 1924 he was sworn of the Privy Council and appointed Minister of Labour under Stanley Baldwin, with a seat in the cabinet, a post he retained until the government fell in June 1929.

Other
Steel-Maitland was awarded honorary degrees of LL.D. by the University of Edinburgh and the University of St Andrews.

Legacy
A new residential area of Erdington, Birmingham had a road named after Arthur Steel-Maitland in December 2016.

Family

Steel-Maitland married Mary, daughter of Sir James Ramsay-Gibson-Maitland, 4th Baronet, of Barnton and Sauchie, in 1901. He died in March 1935, aged 58, and was succeeded in the baronetcy by his son, Arthur.

References

External links 
 

1876 births
1935 deaths
People educated at Rugby School
Alumni of Balliol College, Oxford
Conservative Party (UK) MPs for English constituencies
Members of the Privy Council of the United Kingdom
Presidents of the Oxford Union
UK MPs 1910
UK MPs 1910–1918
UK MPs 1918–1922
UK MPs 1922–1923
UK MPs 1923–1924
UK MPs 1924–1929
UK MPs 1929–1931
UK MPs 1931–1935
Baronets in the Baronetage of the United Kingdom
Chairmen of the Conservative Party (UK)